The office of Treasurer of the Conservative Party was established in 1911, along with that of Chairman, as part of a wider reorganisation of the Conservative and Unionist Party's machinery following the party's failure to win the general elections of January and December 1910.

The officeholders are responsible for fundraising, and in recent years, have sat on the Conservative Party Board.

List
This is a list of Treasurers of the Conservative Party.

References

Further reading
 David Butler and Gareth Butler, Twentieth Century British Political Facts 1900–2000 (Macmillan, 2000) p. 137
 Seth Alexander Thévoz,  "Every Treasurer of the Party Has Gone to the Lords, and I Hope I Don't Set a Precedent by Being the First Who Doesn't": Conservative Party Treasurers and Peerages, 1986-2016 (Oxford: Gwilym Gibbon Centre for Public Policy, Nuffield College, Oxford University, September 2016)